Bassima (born Paula Al Turk on 1 July 1973) is a Lebanese singer also known as a Studio El Fan winner.

Career
Bassima started her career in 1998 releasing singles "Washwashny Habibi Sammaani Kalam", and "Fi Orbak w Bo'dak Hayati Achanak". Later on, she has released six albums working with prominent composers in the region such as Marwan Khoury, Samir Sfeir, Tarek Madkour, Boudi Naoum, and others.

Personal life
Bassima is married to Elie Jbeily. She has two children: Gaia and George.

Discography
 Dawabni Dob (1999), Music Box Studio
 Andy So'al (2001), Rotana Records
 3einy Ya Mo (2002), Rotana Records
 Shou Rajja'ak (2004), Rotana Records
 Shou 3a Bali (2005), Rotana Records
 Helm Toyour (2008), Rotana Records

Releases
 Washwashny Habibi Sammaani Kalam (1998)
 Fi Orbak w Bo'dak Hayati Achanak (1998)
 Raje'ali al-Amal (2015)
 Jarhak 3endi (2016)

References

External links
 Rotana Profile
 Birth Name and Place of Birth – YouTube

1973 births
21st-century Lebanese women singers
Living people
Rotana Records artists
Lebanese Christians